Avi Suquilla Airport  is a public use airport located  east of the central business district of Parker, a town in La Paz County, Arizona, United States. It is owned by the Colorado River Indian Tribes. The airport is located near the Colorado River and serves many people who come into the area to make use of the river.

Facilities and aircraft 
It has one asphalt paved runway designated 1/19 which measures 4,780 by 75 feet (1,457 x 23 m).

For the 12-month period ending May 1, 2007, the airport had 10,200 aircraft operations, an average of 27 per day, all general aviation. At that time there were 29 aircraft based at this airport: 69% single-engine, 24% multi-engine and 7% helicopter. CRIT AIR is the fixed-base operator (FBO) on the field that takes care of fuel, unicom, parking, and other necessities.

Activity 
The airport does not have large carrier service at this time, but it does have a majority of general aviation aircraft on the field as well as two medical flight companies. Tri-State Careflight is the company that makes many of the medical flights in and out of Phoenix and Las Vegas to Parker; they fly the Beechcraft C90 King Air based on the field. TSCF has helicopters that operate in and out of P20 and also do the same type of flights as the fixed wing operations. The TSCF helicopters mostly "lift" from the La Paz Regional Hospital one mile west of the field. Omniflight, the parent company of Native Air, has recently begun operations regularly from P20 as well as the Parker Indian Hospital. As of now, there are no fixed wing operations operated by Native Air, but helicopter operation is spontaneous.

Currently, there is no activity that is a hindrance or a concern to pilots such as parachuting or glider activity, with the exception of sporadic military training operations.

Expansion 
On the new runway, there is one taxiway to exit approximately mid-field at A2. The old runway has been decommissioned and will later be overlaid and become another taxiway. More construction is continually going on that will make flying in easier and more enjoyable. There are future plans to update the fueling office and administration/pilots' lounge.

References

External links 
 Aerial photo from USGS The National Map, 22 May 1994
 Avi Suquilla Airport (P20) at Arizona DOT Airport Directory
 

Airports in La Paz County, Arizona
Native American airports